Halla Tómasdóttir (born 11 October 1968) is an Icelandic business person and public speaker. She is a former member of the founding team of Reykjavík University in 1998. Halla also co-founded Auður Capital, an investment firm.

Halla announced her candidature for the presidency of Iceland on 17 March 2016. She got 27.9% of the vote, the second highest share after that of the winner, Guðni Th. Jóhannesson, who got 39.1%.

In August 2018, Halla became CEO of The B Team, a collective of global business and civil society leaders working to catalyze better business practices for the wellbeing of people and the planet.

References

External links

Living people
1968 births
Halla Tomasdottir
Halla Tomasdottir
Women investors
21st-century businesswomen
21st-century Icelandic women politicians
Candidates for President of Iceland